Mini World may refer to:

MiniWorld, the Mini car owner's club magazine, published by Kelsey Media
Mini World (Japanese magazine), English-learner's magazine in Japan
Mini World (album), a 2014 album by Indila
Mini World (video game), a Chinese sandbox game developed by Miniwan; see List of most-played video games by player count

See also
Mini World Rally Team